St. Dario (or Darius) is a saint of the Oriental Orthodox Churches, the Eastern Orthodox Church and the Catholic Church. His feast day is celebrated October 21 (or December 19 in the Catholic Church).

Darius is mentioned in the old martyrologies as having been martyred in the 4th century in Nicaea alongside Zosimus, Paul and Secundus.  

Their presence there points to the city having an active Christian population at the beginning of this century. Nicaea (now İznik) would become the site of the First Council of Nicaea (325) and the Second Council of Nicaea (787), respectively the first and seventh Ecumenical councils

References

4th-century deaths
Saints from Roman Anatolia
4th-century Christian martyrs
4th-century Romans
Year of birth unknown